The FPF Campeonato de Futebol de Praia (English: FPF Beach Soccer Championship) is a league competition for beach soccer clubs in Portugal. Organised by the Portuguese Football Federation (FPF) who also established the championship in 2012, it is the country's primary beach soccer club competition. The national league replaced a previous championship run by district associations as Portugal's paramount club tournament.

Held between May and September, the season is divided into two parts: the regular season followed by the post-season, with matches taking place across Portugal. Many of the world's best players compete in the championship.

Currently, the competition consists of two divisions: the Elite Championship, the top tier, disputed by the eight best teams who compete for the title – the winners are crowned league champions – and the National Championship, the second tier, open to all other clubs who compete for two promotion spots to the top division. 

The top three teams qualify for the upcoming edition of the Euro Winners Cup (EWC); as of 2020, the league is ranked as the strongest in Europe by Beach Soccer Worldwide (BSWW).

Braga are the most successful club with six titles. Sporting CP are the current champions.

Previous national championships
The first incarnation of a national championship for Portuguese beach soccer clubs with recognition was originally known as the Liga de Clubes de Futebol de Praia and later the Campeonato Elite de Futebol de Praia, which ran from 2005–2011. However, it was not arranged by the Portuguese Football Federation (FPF); the league was established as a result of cooperation between a number of District Football Associations (that of Viana do Castelo, Braga, Porto, Aveiro, Coimbra, Leiria, Santarém, Lisbon, Setúbal and Algarve).

In 2010, a second national league competition was also established which ran for two seasons, known as the Circuito Nacional de Futebol de Praia; unlike the former, this championship received the "institutional support" of the FPF however was still not organised by them – it was run by an independent event organiser.

During this time, there were calls for the FPF to establish their own, official championship. The FPF ultimately started the Campeonato Nacional de Futebol de Praia as the first official national league (that is to say, run by the country's national association) in 2012, superseding the above two de facto national championships which ceased.

Format
As of 2019; current format introduced in 2015 (with minor revisions since).

Overview 
The championship consists of two championships/divisions; clubs can move between the divisions through a system of promotion and relegation: 

Both championships are played in two phases; a regular season (May through August) and a post-season (August/September).

Elite Championship 
Regular season: The clubs play each other once (playing a total of seven matches each) over the course of seven match-days. On each match-day, the fixtures are held in one neutral location in which all eight clubs gather to contest their scheduled matches. This location changes each match-day. Points are earned for the championship table by winning matches. 

At the end of the regular season, the top four teams, those occupying positions 1–4 in the table with the most points, advance to the Finals. The bottom four teams, those occupying positions 5–8 in the table with the least points, proceed to the relegation play-offs.
Post-season: All eight clubs gather in one location for three consecutive days to compete in the post-season phase. 
Finals: The four clubs play each other in a round robin format (playing a total of three matches each). The club with the most points at the completion of all fixtures are crowned league champions.
Relegation play-offs: The four clubs play each other in a round robin format (playing a total of three matches each). The two clubs with the most points at the completion of all fixtures retain their place in the Elite Championship for next season. The two clubs with the least points at the completion of all fixtures will be relegated to the National Championship for next season.

National Championship 
Regular season: The clubs play exclusively against the other members of their own conference, once (playing a total of nine matches each), over the course of nine match-days. On each match-day, the fixtures are held in three locations; one in the north, central and south of Portugal, in which all ten clubs of the corresponding conference gather together to contest their scheduled matches. Points are earned for their tables by winning matches. At the end of the regular season, the top two teams in each conferences, plus the best two third-place teams (total of eight clubs) advance to the Finals.
Post-season: All eight clubs gather in one location for three consecutive days (the same location and dates as the Elite Division post-season events). The eight clubs play each other in a knockout tournament. The two clubs that reach the final are promoted to the Elite Championship for next season; the six clubs knocked out will remain in the National Championship for next season. The winners of the final are crowned National Championship winners.

Clubs

As of 2019

Elite Championship
 Alfarim
 Braga
 CB Loures
 GR Amigos Paz
 Leixões
 Nacional 
 Sesimbra 
 Sporting CP

National Championship

North zone
 Academia Elite Sport
 Âncora Praia
 Boavista
 Chafé
 Chaves 
 Salgueiros 08
 Varzim

Central zone
 ACD O Sótão 
 Belenenses
 Biblioteca IR
 Buarcos 2017
 CB Caldas Rainha
 Chelas
 Estoril Praia
 GR Olival Basto
 Porto Mendo
 Sporting CP B

South zone
 Barreiro SZ
 Charneca Caparica
 Costa Caparica
 Cova da Piedade
 Marítimo
 Praia Milfontes
 Quinta do Conde
 São Domingos 
 Zambujalense

Venues
Scheduled for use during the 2019 season for the Elite Division:
Praia de Buarcos, Figueira da Foz (Matchday 1)
Praia Da Apulia, Apúlia e Fão (Matchday 2)
Campo de Praia Foz do Arelho, Foz do Arelho (Matchday 3)
Praia Do Ouro, Sesimbra (Matchday 4)
Parque Urbano Albarquel, Setúbal (Matchday 5)
Estádio Do Viveiro, Nazaré (Matchday 6 & Finals)
Estádio Desportos de Praia, Porto (Matchday 7)

Results

Elite Championship
The following lists the winners and runners-up of the top tier; the former are crowned Portuguese league champions.

Note: From 2010–2014 there was only one division comprising the league. Those results have been included as de facto Elite Division results.

Performance by club

National Championship
The second tier was introduced in 2015; the following lists the winners and runners-up. Both are promoted to the top tier.

Performance by club

Current season
2019

Performance at the Euro Winners Cup
The Euro Winners Cup (EWC), held every May/June since 2013, is a competition contested by the best teams from Europe's domestic beach soccer leagues to determine a European club champion. 

A club's final league position determines their qualification route to the EWC. The following table shows the history of qualification opportunities for Portuguese clubs: 

The following documents the performances of Portuguese clubs that have qualified for the EWC:

References

External links

Elite Championship
Elite, at Portuguese Football Federation (FPF) 
Divisao Elite, at Football de Praia Portugal 
Campeonato Elite Praia, at zerozero.pt 

National Championship
Nacional, at Portuguese Football Federation (FPF) 
Divisao Nacional, at Football de Praia Portugal 
Campeonato Nacional FutPraia, at zerozero.pt 

Beach soccer in Portugal
Sports competitions in Portugal
National beach soccer leagues